Monterey County Fairgrounds is the site of the annual Monterey County Fair.  It is located within the city limits of Monterey, California.

History 
It was the location of the Monterey Pop Festival in 1967.

Musical events 
The fairgrounds is the site of the Monterey Jazz Festival as well as First City Festival.

External links 
Official website

Music venues in California
Buildings and structures in Monterey, California
Tourist attractions in Monterey, California